VH1 Storytellers is a semi-acoustic live album by Billy Idol, recorded at the VH1 Storytellers in 2001 and released in 2002. It was re-released in 2008 as part of the Sight & Sound series which also includes a DVD of the performance, while the CD features a different order of the songs and adds the bonus track "Untouchables".

Track listing

Musicians
Billy Idol – vocals, guitar
Steve Stevens – guitar
Steven McGrath – bass guitar
Mark Shulman – drums
Joseph Simon – keyboards
Greg Ellis – percussion
Stella Soleil – backing vocals

Billy Idol albums
2002 live albums
VH1 Storytellers